Dean Gemmell (born August 27, 1967) is a Canadian-American curler and writer who currently resides in Short Hills, New Jersey. Along with John Morris, he is the co-author of the book Fit to Curl, Sport Specific Training for the World's Greatest Game.

Career
Gemmell began curling in 1978 as a junior in Ontario. After moving to Montreal, Quebec in 1986, he played as lead for Lawren Steventon and won the Quebec Men's Provincial Curling Championship in 1988, earning an opportunity to represent Quebec at the 1988 Labatt Brier. Quebec finished in eighth place with a 4–7 win–loss record.

Gemmell moved to the United States in 1991, and did not return to curling until he moved to New Jersey in 2006 and curls out of the Plainfield Curling Club in club play. He participated in the playdowns to the United States National Championships and the United States Mixed Championship in 2007. He participated in the 2010 United States Men's Curling Championship as the lead for Matt Hames, finishing fourth after a loss in the playoffs. He then returned the next year under skip Heath McCormick, who replaced Hames, to the 2011 United States Men's Curling Championship, where his team again finished fourth. At the next national championship, he and his team went through the round robin undefeated, and won the championship after defeating Pete Fenson in the final.

The Curling Show
Gemmell created and hosted a curling podcast called The Curling Show from 2005 to 2017. The podcast released a few episodes each month spanning over 100 hours in total and featured interviews with over 250 individuals including various top curlers and curling builders.

Personal life
Gemmell is married to Amye Gemmell and they have four children. He studied at McGill University in Montréal and graduated with a Bachelor of Arts in Political Science and History.

Teams

Men's

Mixed

References

External links
 

American male curlers
Curlers from Ontario
Curlers from Quebec
1967 births
Living people
American curling champions
Continental Cup of Curling participants
Sportspeople from North Vancouver
People from Millburn, New Jersey
Canadian emigrants to the United States
McGill University alumni
Sportspeople from Montreal
People with acquired American citizenship